Typhoon Chaba, known in the Philippines as Tropical Depression Caloy, was a Category 1-equivalent typhoon that struck South China after affecting the Philippines as a tropical depression. The third named storm and second typhoon of the 2022 Pacific typhoon season, Chaba originated from a low-pressure area west of Luzon and developed into a tropical depression on June 28. Chaba made landfall in southwestern Guangdong province, China; at least 12 people died when an offshore crane vessel split in half during the storm and sank.

Meteorological history 

A low-pressure area west of Luzon developed into a tropical depression on June 28. At 20:00 PHT (12:00 UTC), the PAGASA had recognized the storm's development into a tropical depression, began issuing advisories, and named the system Caloy. The following day, the JTWC issued a TCFA for the system. Caloy remained almost stationary in the South China Sea before slowly moving northwestwards, eventually leaving the Philippine Area of Responsibility by 15:00 UTC. As the PAGASA issued its last bulletin on the tropical depression, the JTWC began issuing warnings for the storm and was given the designation 04W. Later, the Japan Meteorological Agency upgraded Caloy into a tropical storm, naming it Chaba. Chaba continued to intensify in the South China Sea, later being upgraded into a severe tropical storm east of Hainan. Typhoon Chaba's outer rainbands produced at least three tornadoes, which impacted Shantou, Chaozhou, and Foshan. On July 1 at 21:00 UTC, the JTWC upgraded Chaba to a typhoon, with the JMA doing the same 3 hours later on July 2 at 0:00 UTC. Later that day at 07:00 UTC, it made landfall on Maoming. Shortly after its landfall, both the JMA and the JTWC assessed that Chaba lost typhoon status, downgrading Chaba to a severe tropical storm and to a tropical storm respectively. The JTWC then issued their final warning on Chaba at 15:00 UTC. Shortly after, the JMA downgraded Chaba to a tropical storm; it was further downgraded to a tropical depression on July 3 at 06:00 UTC.

Impact 
 southwest of Hong Kong, the Fujing 001, a crane vessel tasked in assisting with the construction of an offshore wind farm, split in half and quickly sunk—leaving 26 crew members missing. Three of the 30 crew members were rescued, seen in a video published online by the Hong Kong Government Flying Service. Another person was rescued by July 4, bringing the total number of people rescued to four. Twelve bodies from the ship were recovered. More than 400 flights were suspended in Hainan; one person was injured in Macau.

See also 

 Weather of 2022
 Tropical cyclones in 2022
 Other storms of the same name
 Typhoon Prapiroon (2006) – another Category 1-equivalent typhoon that struck South China
 Typhoon Chanthu (2010) – another typhoon which affected the same areas and also had the same name assigned by PAGASA
 Typhoon Cempaka (2021) – another Category 1-equivalent typhoon that struck South China and Hainan Island

References

External links 

JMA General Information of Typhoon Chaba (2203) from Digital Typhoon
JTWC Best Track Data of Typhoon 04W (Chaba)
04W.CHABA from the U.S. Naval Research Laboratory

2022 meteorology
2022 Pacific typhoon season
Tropical cyclones in 2022
Typhoons
Typhoons in the Philippines
Typhoons in China